Amphithea is the name of several women in Greek mythology:
 Amphithea, who was, according to some, the wife of Lycurgus, king of Nemea, and mother of Opheltes (later called Archemorus).
 Amphithea, daughter of Pronax, son of King Talaus of Argos, and thus, sister to Lycurgus. She married Adrastus and was the mother of Argia, Deipyle, Aegiale, Aegialeus and Cyanippus. Another account refers to her as the wife of Dion and the mother of Carya, Lyco and Orphe.
 Amphithea, wife of Autolycus and mother of Anticlea (the mother of Odysseus), Polymede (possible mother of Jason), and a number of sons, including Aesimus (the father of Sinon).
 Amphithea, wife of Aeolus the Etrurian king, and mother of six sons and six daughters, the youngest boy being Macareus, who made his sister Canace pregnant. Both he and his sister killed themselves.
 Amphithea, an alternate name for Hemithea, the sister of Tenes.

Notes

References 

 Apollodorus, The Library with an English Translation by Sir James George Frazer, F.B.A., F.R.S. in 2 Volumes, Cambridge, MA, Harvard University Press; London, William Heinemann Ltd. 1921. ISBN 0-674-99135-4. Online version at the Perseus Digital Library. Greek text available from the same website.
Homer, The Odyssey with an English Translation by A.T. Murray, PH.D. in two volumes. Cambridge, MA., Harvard University Press; London, William Heinemann, Ltd. 1919. . Online version at the Perseus Digital Library. Greek text available from the same website.
 Lucius Mestrius Plutarchus, Moralia with an English Translation by Frank Cole Babbitt. Cambridge, MA. Harvard University Press. London. William Heinemann Ltd. 1936. Online version at the Perseus Digital Library. Greek text available from the same website.
 Stephanus of Byzantium, Stephani Byzantii Ethnicorum quae supersunt, edited by August Meineike (1790–1870), published 1849. A few entries from this important ancient handbook of place names have been translated by Brady Kiesling. Online version at the Topos Text Project.

Princesses in Greek mythology
Queens in Greek mythology
Argive characters in Greek mythology
Phocian characters in Greek mythology